Julius Goldzier (January 20, 1854 – January 20, 1925) was a U.S. Representative from Illinois.

Born in Vienna, Austria, Goldzier attended the public schools of Vienna and immigrated to the United States in 1866, where he settled in New York.
He studied law and was admitted to the bar.
He moved to Chicago in 1872 and was involved in several notable cases, including that of the anarchist John Hroneck. He was a director of the Chicago German Society as well as the director and secretary of the German-language newspaper the Abendpost.
He served as member of the city council of Chicago as an alderman from the 22nd ward from 1890 to 1892.

Goldzier was elected as a Democrat to the Fifty-third Congress (March 4, 1893 – March 3, 1895).
He was an unsuccessful candidate for reelection in 1894 to the Fifty-fourth Congress and was again a member of the Chicago city council in 1899.
He died in Chicago, January 20, 1925 on his 71st birthday.
Interment location unknown.

Goldzier was Illinois' first Jewish congressman.

See also 
List of Jewish members of the United States Congress

References

1854 births
1925 deaths
19th-century American politicians
American people of Austrian-Jewish descent
Burials at Graceland Cemetery (Chicago)
Illinois lawyers
Chicago City Council members
Democratic Party members of the United States House of Representatives from Illinois
Jewish members of the United States House of Representatives
Austro-Hungarian emigrants to the United States
Austro-Hungarian Jews
19th-century American lawyers